Pamela Cynthia Wu (born 5 March 1974 in Arcata, California) is an American reporter and television host. She joined KCRA 3 in October 2001 as a General Assignment reporter. When Bianca Solorzano left to MSNBC, Wu became the weekend morning news anchor and three-day weekday reporter in 2003. Later in early 2006 she switched to the evening weekend shifts to anchor the 5, 6, 10, and 11pm newscasts. Her last on-air newscast was in late February 2009.

Wu graduated from UC Davis in 1995 with a degree in Rhetoric and Communication. She has received both an Emmy nomination and the Unity Award for her work as the host of the cultural affairs program, "KCRA 3 Common Ground."

Prior to joining KCRA 3, Wu worked as anchor and reporter at stations across Northern California, including KVIQ in Eureka, KION in Salinas/Monterey, and the KCRA 3 sister station in Salinas/Monterey, KSBW. She currently resides in Downtown Sacramento.

Since 23 February 2009, Wu has worked at the University of California, Davis School of Law (King Hall) as a Director of Marketing and Communications.

References
KCRA news webpage

1974 births
Living people
People from Arcata, California
American television journalists
American women television journalists
Television anchors from Sacramento, California
University of California, Davis alumni
21st-century American women